Matoba (written: 的場) is a Japanese surname. Notable people with the surname include:

, also known as Sachi Hamano, Japanese film director
, Japanese sprinter
, Japanese actor and television personality
, Japanese baseball player

Fictional characters
, a character in the manga series Natsume's Book of Friends

Japanese-language surnames